Bhosle is a variant of Bhonsle (or Bhonsale, Bhosale), a prominent group within the Maratha clan system.

Bhosle is name of various notable individuals including:

Asha Bhosle (born 1933), Indian singer best known as a playback singer in Hindi cinema, although she has a wider repertoire
Sudesh Bhosle (born 1960), Indian playback singer who primarily sings for Bollywood films
Varsha Bhosle (1956–2012), Indian singer, journalist and writer based in Mumbai
Vijay Bhosle (born 1937), Indian cricketer

See also
Bhonsle (disambiguation)
Bhosale (disambiguation)